Happy Chef is a  casual dining restaurant in Mankato, Minnesota. It is known for serving breakfast throughout the day and is similar to Denny's, Perkins, and IHOP.

History
The first Happy Chef Restaurant opened in 1963 in Mankato, Minnesota, and still operates today as the only location. At one time, the chain had 65 restaurants in the Midwest. However, consumer tastes shifted in the 1980s towards restaurants offering alcohol and multiple televisions, leaving a single restaurant in operation as of 2022.

Other Concepts
Another concept operated by Happy Chef was Ruttles 50s Bar & Grill Restaurants.

References

External links
 Profile of the original Happy Chef restaurant and its founder - first published in the Mankato Free Press, Mankato, Minnesota, 2005-11-01.

Mankato, Minnesota
Companies based in Minnesota
Economy of the Midwestern United States
Regional restaurant chains in the United States
Restaurants established in 1963
1963 establishments in Minnesota